Shaquill Sno (born 5 January 1996) is a Dutch professional footballer who plays as a full back for Liga I club CS Mioveni.

Career
Sno made his professional debut as a 63rd-minute substitute for Wang Chengkuai in an Eerste Divisie match against De Graafschap on 11 November 2013.

Personal life
Born in the Netherlands, Sno is of Surinamese descent.

References

External links
 
 

1996 births
Living people
Footballers from Amsterdam
Dutch footballers
Dutch sportspeople of Surinamese descent
Association football defenders
Netherlands youth international footballers
AFC Ajax players
Jong Ajax players
Almere City FC players
SC Telstar players
Aalesunds FK players
PFC Lokomotiv Plovdiv players
FC Botoșani players
CS Mioveni players
Eerste Divisie players
Eliteserien players
First Professional Football League (Bulgaria) players
Liga I players
Dutch expatriate footballers
Dutch expatriate sportspeople in Norway
Expatriate footballers in Norway
Dutch expatriate sportspeople in Bulgaria
Expatriate footballers in Bulgaria
Dutch expatriate sportspeople in Romania
Expatriate footballers in Romania